Dolorian is the second full-length album from Finnish metal band Dolorian. It was recorded in 2000 at Tico-Tico studio. The album was released in 2001 and contains 9 tracks.

Track listing
"Grey Rain" - 02:44
"Blue Unknown" - 07:37
"Hidden / Rising " - 08:40
"Cold / Colourless " - 09:09
"Nails " - 02:26
"Numb Lava " - 07:36
"Ambiguous Ambivalence " - 01:54
"Seclusion " - 09:11
"Faces " - 00:56

Lineup
Anti Ittna Haapapuro – Vocals, guitars
Ari Kukkohovi – Drums, guitars, bass
Jussi Ontero – Keyboards

2001 albums
Dolorian albums